Birthdeath Experience is the debut studio album by power electronics band Whitehouse. It was originally released in 1980 through Come Organization. It was released on CD in May 1993 through Susan Lawly, then reissued in 2007 on vinyl through Very Friendly. The original edition was limited to 1,250 copies on vinyl format; 850 with pink/white labels, 400 with Spanish text on the labels.

Track listing

Note : track 6 is silent

Personnel
William Bennett - vocals, synthesizers
Paul Reuter - synthesizers
Peter McKay - engineering
Gordon Hope - mastering (1980 version)
George Peckham - mastering (1993 reissue)

References

External links
  (List of releases)
 Whitehouse 1980-1981 recording dossier at Susan Lawly

1980 debut albums
Whitehouse (band) albums